David Sun (born 12 October 1951) is a Taiwanese-American billionaire businessman, co-founder (with John Tu) and COO of Kingston Technology.

Early life
David Sun was born in October 1951 in Taiwan and was educated at Tatung University. He moved to the United States in 1977.

Career
According to Bloomberg Billionaires Index, Sun has a net worth of US$11.1 billion, as of June 2021.

The David and Diana Sun Foundation, founded in 2001, contributes towards education and healthcare, mainly in Taiwan.

Personal life
He is married with two children and lives in Irvine, California.

References 

1951 births
Living people
American businesspeople
American billionaires
Taiwanese emigrants to the United States
Tatung University alumni